Dangers of the Canadian Mounted is a 1948 Northern Republic film serial.

Plot
A criminal gang discovers a Genghis Khan treasure ship on the Canada-Alaska border. However, the treasure itself is hidden on land. In their efforts to find the hidden riches, they resort to murder and sabotage to stop the construction of the Alcan highway which will bring homesteaders to the area.

Sergeant Christopher 'Chris' Royal of the Royal Canadian Mounted Police and his allies battle their way to find the crooks, and to learn the identity of their mysterious leader known only as 'The Boss'.

Cast
 Jim Bannon as Sergeant Christopher 'Chris' Royal, RCMP
 Virginia Belmont as Roberta "Bobbie" Page
 Anthony Warde as Mort Fowler
 Dorothy Granger as Skagway Kate
 Bill Van Sickel as Dan Page
 Tom Steele as Fagan/Carter/Truck Driver/Lou/Sloane/Spike
 Dale Van Sickel as Boyd/Pete/Bart/Scott/Steele

Production
Dangers of the Canadian Mounted was budgeted at $150,038 although the final negative cost was $150,130 (a $92, or 0.1%, overspend).

It was filmed between 7 October and 28 October 1947.  The serial's production number was 1699.

Stunts
 Tom Steele as Sergeant Chris Royal (doubling Jim Bannon)
 Dale Van Sickel as Mort Fowler (doubling Anthony Warde)
 Carey Loftin
 Eddie Parker
 Ken Terrell
 Bud Wolfe

Special effects
The special Effects were created by the Lydecker brothers.

Release

Theatrical
Dangers of the Canadian Mounteds official release date is 24 April 1948, although this is actually the date the sixth chapter was made available to film exchanges.

This was followed by a re-release of Dick Tracy Returns instead of a new serial.  The next new serial, Adventures of Frank and Jesse James, followed in the autumn.

The serial was re-released on 31 December 1956 between the similar re-releases of Federal Operator 99 and The Purple Monster Strikes.  The last original Republic serial release was King of the Carnival in 1955.

Television
Dangers of the Canadian Mounted was one of twenty-six Republic serials re-released as a film on television in 1966.  The title of the film was changed to R.C.M.P. and the Treasure of Genghis Khan'''''.  This version was cut down to 100 minutes in length.

Chapter titles
 Legend of Genghis Khan (20min)
 Key to the Legend (13min 20s)
 Ghost Town (13min 20s)
 Terror in the Sky (13min 20s)
 Pursuit (13min 20s)
 Stolen Cargo (13min 20s)
 The Fatal Shot (13min 20s)
 False Testimony (13min 20s)
 The Prisoner Spy (13min 20s)
 The Secret Meeting (13min 20s) - a re-cap chapter
 Secret of the Altar (13min 20s)
 Liquid Jewels (13min 20s)
Source:

See also
 List of film serials by year
 List of film serials by studio

References

External links

1948 films
Northern (genre) films
American black-and-white films
1940s English-language films
Republic Pictures film serials
Royal Canadian Mounted Police in fiction
American action films
1940s action films
Films directed by Yakima Canutt
1940s American films